Janet Heine Barnett is a professor of mathematics at Colorado State University–Pueblo, interested in set theory, mathematical logic, the history of mathematics, women in mathematics, and mathematics education.

Education and career
Barnett is originally from Pueblo, Colorado.
She did her undergraduate studies at Colorado State University, entering as an engineering student but switching to a double major in mathematics and humanities. She graduated in 1981, served in the Peace Corps teaching mathematics in Bambari in the Central African Republic from 1982 to 1984, and in doing so discovered her love for teaching mathematics.

She completed her doctorate in 1990, at the University of Colorado Boulder. Her dissertation, Random Reals, Cohen Reals and Variants of Martin's Axioms, concerned set theory; it was supervised by Richard Laver. In the same year she joined the CSU Pueblo faculty.

Recognition
In 2015, Barnett won the Burton W. Jones Award for Distinguished College or University Teaching of the Mathematical Association of America.
In 2017, she won the Deborah and Franklin Haimo Awards for Distinguished College or University Teaching of Mathematics, for excellence in teaching reaching beyond her own campus. The award recognized in particular her work in integrating the history of mathematics, and its original source documents, into the teaching of mathematics, and her mentorship of mathematics schoolteachers.

References

Year of birth missing (living people)
Living people
People from Pueblo, Colorado
American women mathematicians
20th-century American mathematicians
21st-century American mathematicians
Peace Corps volunteers
Colorado State University alumni
University of Colorado Boulder alumni
Colorado State University Pueblo faculty
20th-century women mathematicians
21st-century women mathematicians
20th-century American women
21st-century American women